Massachusetts House of Representatives' 4th Barnstable district in the United States is one of 160 legislative districts included in the lower house of the Massachusetts General Court. It covers part of Barnstable County. Democrat Sarah Peake of Provincetown has represented the district since 2007.

Towns represented
The district includes the following localities:
 part of Brewster
 Chatham
 Eastham
 Harwich
 Orleans
 Provincetown
 Truro
 Wellfleet

The current district geographic boundary overlaps with that of the Massachusetts Senate's Cape and Islands district.

Representatives
 Nathaniel E. Atwood, circa 1858 
 Thomas H. Lewis, circa 1858 
 James Gifford, circa 1859 
 Daniel Paine, circa 1859 
 Peter L. McDowell, circa 1975 
 Shirley Gomes, 1995–2007
 Sarah K. Peake, 2007-current

See also
 List of Massachusetts House of Representatives elections
 Other Barnstable County districts of the Massachusetts House of Representatives: 1st, 2nd, 3rd, 5th; Barnstable, Dukes and Nantucket
 List of Massachusetts General Courts
 List of former districts of the Massachusetts House of Representatives

References

External links
 Ballotpedia
  (State House district information based on U.S. Census Bureau's American Community Survey).
 League of Women Voters of the Cape Cod Area

House
Government of Barnstable County, Massachusetts